Naâma (Arabic: النعامة or نعامة) is a municipality in Naâma Province, Algeria, of which it is the province seat. It is coextensive with the district of Naâma and has a population of 8,256, (in 1998) which gives it 7 seats in the PMA. Its population is 16,251 as per the census of 2008.

Its postal code is 45000 and its municipal code is 4501. Its telephone code is 049 nationally, or +213 49 internationally.

 
Communes of Naâma Province
Province seats of Algeria